Radar Station, Mazandaran ( – Īstgāh-e Rādār) is a village and military installation in Saheli Rural District, in the Central District of Babolsar County, Mazandaran Province, Iran. At the 2006 census, its population was 367, in 112 families.

References 

Populated places in Babolsar County
Military installations of Iran